Armindo Tué Na Bangna (born 24 October 1994), known as Bruma, is a Portuguese professional footballer who plays for Braga on loan from Turkish club Fenerbahçe as a winger, with skill and speed being his main assets.

Club career

Sporting CP
Born in Bissau, Guinea-Bissau, Bruma moved to Portugal as a child, joining Sporting CP's academy before his 13th birthday. He proceeded to score more than 80 goals for the club's various youth sides.

Bruma made his senior debut in the 2012–13 season, starting with the B team in the Segunda Liga. On 6 December 2012 he netted twice against C.F. União, but was also sent off in the 3–2 away loss.

On 10 February 2013, at the age of 18, Bruma made his official debut with the Lions main squad, playing the first half of the 0–1 home defeat against C.S. Marítimo. He scored his first Primeira Liga goal the following matchday, the first in a 3–2 win at Gil Vicente FC.

Galatasaray
On 3 September 2013, after a lengthy and sour contract dispute with Sporting, ultimately resolved in the club's favour, Bruma signed a five-year deal with Turkish giants Galatasaray SK for €10 million. He made his debut ten days later against Antalyaspor, coming on as a substitute in the 1–1 draw.

Bruma made his maiden UEFA Champions League appearance on 17 September 2013, playing roughly 30 minutes in a 1–6 home loss to Real Madrid in the group stage. He made his first assist for his new club in a local derby against Beşiktaş JK, a 2–1 away victory, and scored his first goal against Balıkesirspor on 18 December, in a 4–0 win in the campaign's Turkish Cup.

On 15 January 2014, also in the domestic cup but against Tokatspor, Bruma suffered a serious knee injury and was sidelined for most of the season. Due to this and the restriction on foreign players allowed per team, he was loaned to fellow Süper Lig side Gaziantepspor, failing to play any matches.

Bruma was loaned to Spain's Real Sociedad in the 2015 off-season, in a season-long deal. He made his La Liga debut on 22 August, starting and playing 85 minutes in a 0–0 away draw with Deportivo de La Coruña.

Bruma scored his first competitive goal for the Basques on 3 December 2015, in a 2–1 loss at UD Las Palmas in the Copa del Rey (3–2 aggregate). His first in the league arrived 27 days later, as he came on as an early substitute for the injured Imanol Agirretxe and netted the 1–1 equaliser against Real Madrid, but in an eventual 3–1 defeat at the Santiago Bernabéu Stadium.

RB Leipzig
On 4 June 2017, Bruma completed a €12.5m move to German club RB Leipzig, with a €2.5m bonus. He made his Bundesliga debut on 19 August, playing 15 minutes in a 2–0 away loss against FC Schalke 04. He scored his first goal for his new club the following weekend, helping the hosts defeat SC Freiburg 4–1.

Bruma was sparingly played by manager Ralf Rangnick during the 2018–19 season, only totalling 14 league appearances. He was also sidelined for two months, due to injury.

PSV
On 28 June 2019, Bruma signed a five-year contract at PSV Eindhoven. He made his official debut on 23 July, in a Champions League game against FC Basel in which he scored his first goal for the club; he repeated the feat in the second leg, but his team were eliminated on the away goals rule.

Bruma joined Olympiacos F.C. on a season-long loan on 3 October 2020, with an option to make the move permanent for €7 million the following 30 June. He scored on 11 April 2021 in a 3–1 win over Panathinaikos F.C. in the Derby of the eternal enemies, as his club won the title.

Fenerbahçe
On 20 January 2023, having started the campaign on loan, Bruma agreed to a permanent two-and-a-half-year deal at Fenerbahçe S.K. after the club exercised the option to buy his rights. Nine days later, however, he was loaned to S.C. Braga until 30 June with no option to buy. He marked his debut with a brace, scoring twice in injury time of the 4–1 home defeat of F.C. Famalicão after replacing Abel Ruiz.

International career
Still aged 18, Bruma was part of the Portugal under-20 side that competed in the 2013 FIFA World Cup in Turkey. He was awarded the Silver Shoe as second top scorer of the tournament, scoring five times in four games in an eventual round-of-16 exit.

Bruma played his first game for the under-21s on 10 October 2013, 14 days shy of his 19th birthday, and he netted the second from a close-range header in an eventual 3–0 home win against Israel for the 2015 UEFA European Under-21 Championship qualifiers. Just two days later he was called by full side manager Paulo Bento, replacing suspended Cristiano Ronaldo for the last 2014 FIFA World Cup qualifier against Luxembourg.

Bruma won his first full cap on 10 November 2017, replacing Gonçalo Guedes for the last 15 minutes of the 3–0 friendly win over Saudi Arabia in Viseu. He scored his first goal the following 14 October in another exhibition game, helping to a 3–1 win over Scotland at Hampden Park.

Personal life
Bruma's older brother, Mesca, is also a footballer and a winger. He too played youth football for Sporting, also spending his formative years at Chelsea and Fulham.

Career statistics
Club

International

Scores and results list Portugal's goal tally first, score column indicates score after each Bruma goal.

HonoursGalatasaraySüper Lig: 2014–15
Turkish Cup: 2013–14, 2014–15
Turkish Super Cup: 2016Olympiacos 
Super League Greece: 2020–21PSVKNVB Cup: 2021–22
Johan Cruyff Shield: 2021Individual'
Segunda Liga Breakthrough Player of the Year: 2012–13
FIFA U-20 World Cup Silver Shoe: 2013
UEFA European Under-21 Championship Bronze Boot: 2017
Super League Greece Player of the Month: April 2021
Eredivisie Player of the Month: August 2021
Eredivisie Team of the Month: August 2021

References

External links

1994 births
Living people
Bissau-Guinean emigrants to Portugal
Portuguese sportspeople of Bissau-Guinean descent
Sportspeople from Bissau
Black Portuguese sportspeople
Bissau-Guinean footballers
Portuguese footballers
Association football wingers
Primeira Liga players
Liga Portugal 2 players
Sporting CP B players
Sporting CP footballers
S.C. Braga players
Süper Lig players
Galatasaray S.K. footballers
Gaziantepspor footballers
Fenerbahçe S.K. footballers
La Liga players
Real Sociedad footballers
Bundesliga players
RB Leipzig players
Eredivisie players
PSV Eindhoven players
Super League Greece players
Olympiacos F.C. players
Portugal youth international footballers
Portugal under-21 international footballers
Portugal international footballers
Bissau-Guinean expatriate footballers
Portuguese expatriate footballers
Expatriate footballers in Turkey
Expatriate footballers in Spain
Expatriate footballers in Germany
Expatriate footballers in the Netherlands
Expatriate footballers in Greece
Portuguese expatriate sportspeople in Turkey
Portuguese expatriate sportspeople in Spain
Portuguese expatriate sportspeople in Germany
Portuguese expatriate sportspeople in the Netherlands
Portuguese expatriate sportspeople in Greece